Gandheswari River is a tributary,  long, of the Dwarakeswar River and flows in Bankura district in the Indian state of West Bengal. Flowing south-west of Susunia Hill and north of Bankura it joins the Dwarakeswar near Bhutsahar. It is subject to sudden flooding during rains.

See also

List of rivers of India
Rivers of India

References

Rivers of West Bengal
Rivers of India